Yeoninsan is a mountain in the county of Gapyeong, Gyeonggi-do in South Korea.

See also
 List of mountains in Korea

Notes

References
 

Mountains of South Korea
Gapyeong County
Mountains of Gyeonggi Province